In mathematics, weak equivalence may refer to:

 Weak equivalence of categories
 Weak equivalence (homotopy theory)
 Weak equivalence (formal languages)